Marianne Enckell (born 1944) is an archivist of anarchism and the director of the anarchist research center Centre International de Recherches sur l'Anarchisme. She also worked at trade unions and as a freelance translator.

References

Further reading 

 

Female archivists
Living people
1944 births